The men's 400 metre freestyle at the 2007 World Aquatics Championships took place on 25 March (preliminaries and finals) at Rod Laver Arena in Melbourne, Australia.

On 11 September 2007, the Court of Arbitration for Sport, as part of a retroactive 18-month suspension for an earlier doping infraction, nullified Tunisia's Oussama Mellouli's results from these championships, which affected this event and the men's 800 metre freestyle in particular.

Records
Prior to the competition, the existing world and championship records were as follows.

No new world or competition records were set during this competition.

Results

Final

Heats

See also
Swimming at the 2005 World Aquatics Championships – Men's 400 metre freestyle
Swimming at the 2008 Summer Olympics – Men's 400 metre freestyle
Swimming at the 2009 World Aquatics Championships – Men's 400 metre freestyle

References

Swimming at the 2007 World Aquatics Championships